The St. Pölten University of Applied Sciences (German: Fachhochschule St. Pölten) is a provider of higher education within the areas of Rail Technology & Mobility, Health Sciences, Computer Science & Security, Digital Business & Innovation, Media & Digital Technologies, and Social Sciences. The combination of subject areas in teaching and research creates room for interdisciplinary scientific findings, products and solutions for the industry and society. Approximately 3.700 students are currently acquiring a practice-oriented academic education in various study programmes and further education programmes.

Facts 
The St Polten University of Applied Sciences, which coordinates six universities of applied sciences from the same number of nations as a European University in the E3UDRES2 project  of the European University Alliance, was one of the finalists in the category of the Young Entrepreneurial University of the Year 2022 at the Europe Triple E-Awards along with GEA College, Universidade NOVA Lisboa, UC Leuven-Limburg and Stuttgart Media University.

In 2021, the Spin-off Austria Initiative, which promotes entrepreneurship in university education, awarded the St. Pölten University of Applied Sciences with 1st place in the "University of Applied Sciences" category.

According to the trend magazine, St. Pölten UAS ranks 10th on the list of Austria's Best 300 Employers.

History 
The history of the UAS St. Pölten began in 1993, when the "Verein zur Föderung der Gesellschaft zur Durchführung von Fachhochschul-Studiengängen St. Pölten m.b.H." (eng.: Association for the Advancement of the Society for the Implementation of the University of Applied Sciences St. Pölten ltd.) was founded. In the academic year 1996/97 with Telecommunication and Media the first degree programme started. In January 2004 the facility was awarded the legal designation 'University of Applied Sciences'. In 2007 the St. Pölten UAS moved to the building in the Matthias Corvinus-Straße.  At the moment the educational offer covers 13 bachelor's and 13 master's degree programmes as well as 24 further education courses.

Study programmes

Degree programmes

Bachelor's degree programmes

 Creative Computing
 Data Science and Business Analytics
 Dietetics
 Health and Nursing PLUS
 IT Security
 Management & Digital Business
 Marketing & Communication
 Media Management
 Media Technology
 Physiotherapy
 Railway Technology and Mobility
 Smart Engineering of Production Technologies and Processes
 Social Work

Master's degree programmes
Cyber Security and Resilience
Data Intelligence
Digital Business Communications
Digital Design
Digital Healthcare
Digital Innovation and Research
Digital Marketing & Communication
Digital Media Management
 Digital Media Production
Information Security
Interactive Technologies
 Rail Technology and Management of Railway Systems
 Social Work

Further educational courses 

The spectrum of further education programmes is continuously expanded. Most of these are offered on a part-time basis.

Research 
The St. Pölten UAS conducts research in the following institutes and fields of competence:

 Institute for Innovation Systems: The institute puts special focus on digitalisation and ecologization when investigating the interactions between culture, economic and regulatory facets of organisational and social innovation
Institute of Creative\Media/Technologies: The media focus at the IC\M/T consists of the research groups for Video Production, Audio Design, Media Computing, and Mobile. The institute conducts research in the focus areas creative content & digital heritage, info- & edutainment, and smart tools & digital workflows.
Institute of IT Security Research: The research focuses on privacy, biometrics, IT forensics, industrial security, anti-forensics, security management, and software security.
Carl Ritter von Ghega Institute for Integrated Mobility Research: The institute engages in application-oriented research and development with transport and mobility as focus areas.
Institute of Health Sciences: Topics range from nutrition and exercise in health promotion, disease prevention, therapy and rehabilitation to quality assurance with special consideration for the subject areas of geriatric nutrition, consulting techniques, posture – exercise – locomotion, and health services research as well as interdisciplinary and multidisciplinary topics.
Ilse Arlt Institute for Social Inclusion Research: The institute conducts research in the fields of social diagnostics, social space analysis, client participation, diversity, senior citizens and their relatives, general questions of inclusion, and use of new media.
Center for Digital Health Innovation: Topic areas are information and communication technology in the healthcare sector with a focus on active assisted living and motor rehabilitation.
Josef Ressel and COMET Centers: The purpose is to explore and enhance IT security in case of targeted attacks against companies.

UAS Board 
In the UAS Board election of 2020, Alois Frotschnig was elected as chairperson of the board and Susanne Roiser as deputy chairperson for a term of three years.

Campus 
In the winter semester 2007/08, the St. Pölten University of Applied Sciences moved into its 14,300-square-metre building which was newly completed at the time.

Infrastructure:

 Five lecture halls with room for up to 215 people
 24 seminar rooms
 Ten multimedia labs
 Seven computer rooms
 An assembly hall for up to 500 people
 A canteen that seats approximately 170 persons
 225 parking spaces
 A library with roughly 50,000 items

Since 2013, the UAS has rented additional rooms in the nearby Business & Innovation Centre (BIZ). It also maintains further UAS locations in Heinrich Schneidmadl-Straße, Herzogenburger Straße and Wiener Straße. In 2021, the main building will be extended by another directly adjoining new building to form the Campus St. Pölten. The library of the St. Pölten UAS has a collection of about 50.000 media and has also been hosting a branch of the city library of St. Pölten since 2013.

The St. Pölten UAS maintains a number of service units to support its students in organisational matters. The campus sports club offers a wide range of courses that can be found here.

It takes only about 10–15 minutes to walk from the Campus St. Pölten to the city’s main train station. Student residences can be found in close proximity of the UAS. Two natural bathing lakes are within walking distance as well. Further information on housing and leisure activities in St. Pölten is available here

Campus media

Campus Radio 94.4 
The free radio station also serves as the educational radio of the St. Pölten UAS and is the only terrestrial student broadcaster in Austria. All aspects of everyday radio life are managed exclusively by students. The fields of activity include everything from moderation and programme design, technology and audio production to marketing and event organisation.

Magazine SUMO 
The specialist magazine of the bachelor degree programme Media Management is published twice a year and offers students the opportunity to experience all steps in a media company within the framework of practice labs and an interdisciplinary optional subject:

 Planning topics
 Conducting research
 Interviewing
 Writing articles
 Winning advertising and sales partners
 Organising release events
 Producing the magazine

SUMO (print, 2.500 copies) and SUMOMAG.at (online) offer interesting reports, features and interviews on current topics from the media sector for media managers, teachers and students as well as pupils of schools with a media focus.

c-tv – TV Research Lab 
c-tv produces reports on current topics, short films and pilots. It also serves as an experimental lab for new TV formats and experiments with the television medium. All contributions are produced by students of the St. Pölten UAS. Under the guidance of experienced lecturers, the students become familiar with all processes involved in the development, production and presentation of a TV broadcast, and carry them out independently.

fhSPACEtv 
fhSPACEtv is an interdisciplinary initiative launched by the Media Technology and Digital Media Technologies programmes at the Institute of Creative\Media/Technologies under the direction of Prof. Markus Wintersberger, Christian Müller and Thomas Wagensommerer. The aim of this collaboration is to bundle creative and artistic potential within the university’s departments and to integrate specific approaches and requirements for digital media by pooling contemporary and alternative information channels and forms of presentation for students.

International affairs 
The St. Pölten UAS maintains relationships with approximately 150 partner universities in 30 countries. The international coordinators maintain professional contact with partner universities of their focus areas in research and teaching. They consult incoming and outgoing student in subject-related matters, in particular in course selection. The international coordinators work in close collaboration with the Office for International Relations, which offers organisational and administrative support.

Prizes, certificates and distinctions (selection) 
 Young entrepreunal university of the year 2022 https://europe.triple-e-awards.com/
 1st place in Solar Decathlon 2013 (as part of the consortium Team Austria)(Solar Decathlon)
 German Library Index (BIX)(categories “efficiency” and “use”)
 “Bibliotheken Award“ (library award) of the province of Lower Austria (category “innovations in library management“)
 Diploma Supplement Label
 Distinction of the Career Service in the Universum Survey 2016
 Excellent ratings for the alumni work of the St. Pölten UAS in the Alumniscore 2016
 Top marks for the bachelor degree programme IT Security in the CHE Ranking (categories “study situation”, “mentoring by lecturers”, “completion of studies within reasonable time period”)
 Distinction as best place to work in the sector “education and research” 2020 (Top Arbeitgeber: Branchenbeste im Bildungsbereich)

Sources

External links 
 Homepage of the Sankt Poelten University of Applied Sciences (in German and English)
 Campus Radio 94.4 (in German)
 SUMO educational magazine (in German)
 Institute for Media Informatics (in German)
 Ilse Arlt Institute for Social Inclusion Research (in German)

Educational institutions established in 1993
St. Pölten University of Applied Sciences
Sankt Pölten
Buildings and structures in Lower Austria
Education in Lower Austria
1993 establishments in Austria
Buildings and structures in Sankt Pölten